Beitstadfjorden is the innermost arm of the Trondheimsfjord in Trøndelag county, Norway. It is located in the municipalities of Steinkjer, Inderøy, and a small part extends into Indre Fosen.

The fjord begins at the Skarnsund strait in the south and extends northeast to the city of Steinkjer. On the far western part of the fjord, the Verrasundet strait extends south to the village of Verrabotn in Indre Fosen, while in the north the Beitstad strait stretches northward past the villages of Malm, Beitstad, and Vellamelen. In Inderøy, the villages of Kjerknesvågen and Breivika are located along the shoreline. Follafoss is located along the north side of the fjord.

See also
 List of Norwegian fjords

References

Fjords of Trøndelag
Steinkjer
Inderøy
Indre Fosen